Vulcaniella schultzendorffi is a moth in the family Cosmopterigidae. It was described by Hans Georg Amsel in 1958 and is found in Iran.

References

Vulcaniella
Moths described in 1958